Other People's Sins is a 1931 British crime film directed by Sinclair Hill and starring Horace Hodges, Stewart Rome and Anne Grey. It was made at Cricklewood Studios. The screenplay concerns a father who takes the blame for a crime committed by his daughter.

Cast
 Horace Hodges as Carfax  
 Stewart Rome as Anthony Vernon Barrister  
 Anne Grey as Anne Vernon 
 Arthur Margetson as Bernard Barrington  
 Adeline Hayden Coffin as Mrs. Vernon  
 A. Harding Steerman as Prosecution  
 Clifton Boyne as Juror 
 Arthur Hambling as Fireman 
 Sam Wilkinson as Actor 
 Frederick Burtwell as Junior Counsel  
 Russell T. Carr as The Tragedian  
 Arthur Hardy as Judge

References

Bibliography
Chibnall, Steve. Quota Quickies: The Birth of the British 'B' Film. British Film Institute, 2007.
Low, Rachael. Filmmaking in 1930s Britain. George Allen & Unwin, 1985.
Wood, Linda. British Films, 1927–1939. British Film Institute, 1986.

External links
 

1931 films
1931 crime films
British crime films
Films shot at Cricklewood Studios
Films directed by Sinclair Hill
British black-and-white films
1930s English-language films
1930s British films